Young Heart is the fourth studio album by English singer-songwriter Birdy, released on 30 April 2021 by Atlantic Records. The album was announced on 22 January 2021 with the release of the first single "Surrender".

Background 
While reaching the end of the tour for her 2016 album Beautiful Lies, she admits to feeling that she was "acting a little bit" and instead wanted to capture the more quiet and gentle aspects of how she normally writes and sings songs alone. In the four years after release of Beautiful Lies, Birdy took a break from releasing music, eventually reintroducing herself in November 2020 with the release of the EP Piano Sketches. 

In the period between Beautiful Lies and Young Heart, Birdy credits "writer's block" and the need for "some time to live a bit" as reasons why it took four years to finish the album.

Before writing for the album began, Birdy suffered from a breakup and looked to the music of Etta James and Nina Simone for emotional support. To get inspiration for writing and to shake the sadness of the breakup, Birdy took a three month hiatus to India with her sister, cousin and their friend before staying in a log cabin in Topanga, California for inspiration. Staying in the cabin gave the album a "kind of Laurel Canyon, seventies-like feel" according to Birdy. The result is what she calls a "heartbreak album" inspired by the Joni Mitchell album Blue. The first track written for Young Heart was the title track "Young Heart" that acts as the "core of the record" and is the "most emotionally charged song" for Birdy. The track "Loneliness" in contrast was originally written for 2016's Beautiful Lies but was set aside at the time for not fitting into that album.

Recording 
In a departure from the "big production" of the previous album, Birdy said that Young Heart is "quite stripped back – anything that didn't need to be there, isn't. There's no decoration". To record the album, Birdy worked with producers Ian Fitchuk and Daniel Tashian who had previously worked on Kacey Musgraves' 2018 album Golden Hour.

The recording sessions for the album took place in Nashville. The recording of the album was completed just before the COVID-19 pandemic hit in March 2020 and the album was intended to be released soon thereafter. It was delayed as a result of the pandemic but this allowed greater time for Birdy to reflect on the album and make small changes accordingly. While staying at her family home in New Forest during the pandemic, she set up a makeshift mixer studio in a cupboard and was finishing bits of the record at home.

Promotion 
On 15 April 2021, Birdy performed a livestreamed concert at Wilton's Music Hall in London accompanied by a band including eight string players, a clarinet player and a French horn player. The show was shot by director Ed Coleman. Kate Soloman for iNews rated the performance four out of five stars and called the livestreamed performance "a masterful livestream, full of beautiful noise".

On 30 April, coinciding with the release of the album, Birdy held an album launch party on YouTube by performing a 7-song setlist decided by fans.

Release 
Young Heart was released on CD, cassette, vinyl and digital formats. An exclusive purple-coloured 140g vinyl LP is available from Birdy's website which is made from 100% recycled plastic and the LP inner and outer sleeves are made from 100% recycled paper. Each of these recycled pressings are unique as a result of being made from composite materials, a byproduct of wastage in pressing other vinyl records.

Critical reception  

Upon its release, Young Heart received critical acclaim from music critics. At Metacritic, which assigns a normalized rating out of 100 to reviews from mainstream critics, the album has an average score of 84, based on 4 critical reviews, indicating "universal acclaim".

The Times praised the album, awarding it four stars, for its "sentiments so uncynical and wide-eyed that it is impossible not to be charmed". A four-star review from NME praised the album as a "gorgeous album that perfectly captures the meandering journey that heartbreak takes you on" and praised the more stripped back style of songs for allowing Birdy's emotions to come to the fore. However, the review criticised the momentum of the 16-song tracklist with "River Song" and "Little Blue". Likewise, Lauren Murphy for The Irish Times writes that at times "Young Heart is too long-winded for its own good". In contrast, a 7/10 review for The Line of Best Fit called it a "coherent addition to an already charming catalogue from Birdy" that is "consistent from start to finish".

Track listing

Personnel 
Musicians
 Jasmine Van den Bogaerde – vocals, guitar, piano, mellotron, synthesizer, organ
 Ian Fitchuk    – bass guitar, drums, mellotron
 Daniel Tashian – synthesizer, background vocals, bass, mellotron
 James Ford     – synthesizer, 12-string guitar, drums, harmonium, hammond organ
 Matt Combs         – strings
 Tyler Summers      – Bass clarinet, flute
 Austin Hoke        – Cello

Production
 Jasmine Van den Bogaerde – vocal recording engineer
 Ian Fitchuk    – recording engineer, production 
 Daniel Tashian – recording engineer, production 
 James Ford     – production 
 Sara Law           – executive production

 Rachel Moore       – assistant engineer
 Cenzo Townshend    – mixing engineer
 Mark Stent         – mixing engineer
 Camden Clarke      – assistant mixing engineer
 Matt Wolach        – assistant mixing engineer
 Robert Sellens     – assistant mixing engineer

 Jonny Wright       – additional production
 Josh Moore         – music editor
 Stuart Hawkes      – mastering engineer

Charts

Release history

Young Heart Tour

Tour dates

References

2021 albums
Birdy (singer) albums
Atlantic Records albums